Roccellina is a genus of lichen-forming fungi in the family Roccellaceae.

Taxonomy
The genus was circumscribed in 1898 by British botanist Otto Vernon Darbishire with Roccellina condensata as the type, and at that time, only species. A year earlier, Darbishire published the genus Roccellaria to contain the species Roccellaria intricata. More than a century later, molecular phylogenetic analysis showed that this species is nested in the polyphyletic genus Roccellina. Because Roccellaria was published earlier than Roccellina, the name Roccellaria has priority, threatening to disrupt the nomenclature of all the Roccellina species. To avoid this nomenclatural instability, Swedish botanist Anders Tehler made a proposal to formally conserve the name Roccellina over Roccellaria; the proposal was later accepted by the Nomenclature Committee for Fungi in 2010.

Species
Roccellina arboricola 
Roccellina capensis 
Roccellina condensata 
Roccellina corrugata 
Roccellina cumingiana 
Roccellina exspectata 
Roccellina hypomecha 
Roccellina leptothalla 
Roccellina mollis 
Roccellina ochracea 
Roccellina portentosa

References

Roccellaceae
Ascomycota genera
Lichen genera
Taxa described in 1898
Taxa named by Otto Vernon Darbishire